Reda Yadi (born 1 April 1963) is an Algerian swimmer. He competed in two events at the 1980 Summer Olympics.

References

External links
 

1963 births
Living people
Algerian male swimmers
Olympic swimmers of Algeria
Swimmers at the 1980 Summer Olympics
Place of birth missing (living people)
21st-century Algerian people